The 2021 Lebanese Elite Cup was the 23rd edition of the Lebanese Elite Cup. The competition included the six best teams from the 2020–21 Lebanese Premier League season. The first matchday was played on 12 July, one day before the start of the 2021 Lebanese Challenge Cup. Shabab Sahel, the defending champions, lost to Ahed in the semi-finals. Nejmeh were crowned champions for the 12th time, after defeating Ahed in the final after penalty shoot-outs.

Group stage

Group A

Group B

Final stage

Semi-finals

Final

Top scorers

References

External links
 RSSSF

Lebanese Elite Cup seasons
Elite